The ANBO IV was a reconnaissance aircraft used by the Lithuanian Air Force in World War II, designed by Lithuanian aircraft designer Antanas Gustaitis. The Lithuanian ANBO 41 was far ahead of the most modern foreign reconnaissance aircraft of that time in structural features, and most importantly in speed and in rise time. All ANBO 41 aircraft were likely destroyed during World War II.

Development
The ANBO IV was developed from the ANBO III trainer. The design was supervised by Colonel Antanas Gustaitis. The first flight took place on 14 July 1932, the prototype being powered by a Wasp engine. After successful trials, series production began. Thirteen series-built aircraft were powered by British Bristol Pegasus engines and were manufactured by Lithuanian Aircraft State Factory. It could be armed with two pairs of light machine guns and could carry 200 kg of bombs.

Operational history
ANBO IVs were introduced into Lithuanian Air Force in 1934 and shortly before that a few aircraft made demonstration flights in a few European countries: France, United Kingdom, Soviet Union and most Scandinavian countries. Between 25 June and 29 July 1934, three aircraft commanded by colonel Gustaitis flew  route.

ANBO IV and ANBO 41 aircraft equipped one and two reconnaissance squadrons respectively in Lithuanian Air Force, at the time of the Soviet occupation of the Baltic states in the summer of 1940.

A photo exists showing that at least one Anbo IV or Anbo 41 survived this period and was operated by the Luftwaffe during the German occupation.

Variants
ANBO IV
Designation of prototype and 13 serial-built aircraft used for night and day reconnaissance.
ANBO 41
Second production version with more powerful engine and three-blade wooden propeller. It was then the only aircraft in Europe to employ a wooden three-blade propeller.

Operators

Lithuanian Air Force

Soviet Air Force incorporated Lithuanian units with equipment and personnel.

Luftwaffe used at least one Anbo 41 captured from the Soviet Air Force for training and liaison purposes in 1941–1942.

Specifications (ANBO 41)

See also
 Antanas Gustaitis
 Lithuanian Air Force

References

 
 Lithuanian Aviation Museum

External links 

Lithuanian description 

1930s Lithuanian military reconnaissance aircraft
4
Parasol-wing aircraft
Single-engined tractor aircraft
Aircraft first flown in 1932